Jörg-Wolfgang Jahn (born 1936) is a German violinist and music educator.

Life 
Born in Saalfeld, Jahn studied violin in Cologne with Max Rostal. He also took chamber music lessons with Maurits Frank, Günter Kehr, János Starker and the members of the Quartetto Italiano. In 1963, he received a first prize at the Felix Mendelssohn Bartholdy Prize (piano trio).

Since 1968 Jahn was a lecturer and from 1972 to 2001 professor for violin and chamber music at the Hochschule für Musik Karlsruhe, where he was responsible for chamber music and for the chamber orchestra of the university. He gave master classes in Europe and oversea as well as chamber music courses in Germany and abroad. Among his students were Isabel Charisius, Cordelia Palm, Anton Steck, Xaver Paul Thoma, Tianwa Yang and in the field of chamber music the Fauré Quartet and the Mandelring Quartet, among others.

His artistic activity consists of concertmaster activities in chamber and symphony orchestras. He is a member of the Bartholdy-Quartet (founded in 1968). Jahn has participated in television, film, radio and recordings, including the complete recording of the string quartets of Felix Mendelssohn Bartholdy.

Awards 
 Grand Prix du Disque
 Deutscher Schallplattenpreis for the complete recording (1973) of the string quartets by Felix Mendelssohn Bartholdy

References

External links 
 
 

German classical violinists
German music educators
Academic staff of the Hochschule für Musik Karlsruhe
1936 births
Living people
People from Saalfeld